V&A Dundee is a design museum in Dundee, Scotland, which opened on 15 September 2018. The V&A Dundee is the first design museum in Scotland and the first Victoria and Albert museum outside London. The V&A Dundee is also the first building in the United Kingdom designed by Kengo Kuma.

History 

The plan for a V&A museum in Dundee originated at the University of Dundee in 2007 when Georgina Follett (then Dean of Duncan of Jordanstone College of Art and Design) suggested it to the University Principal, Sir Alan Langlands. Subsequently, Joan Concannon, the university's director of external relations, made a 20-minute pitch to Sir Mark Jones, then director of the Victoria and Albert Museum, in which the case for Dundee was made, including its potential as an anchor for the urban regeneration of the waterfront.

A design competition took place in 2010 to decide what the museum would look like. The Japanese architect Kengo Kuma won the competition; his design was inspired by the eastern cliff edges of Scotland.

Construction 
The museum was constructed where the Olympia Leisure Centre stood previously.

BAM Construction carried out the construction work beginning in April 2014. The original completion date was 2017 but it was delayed to 2018. During construction a cofferdam was installed to allow the outer wing to expand onto the River Tay and 780 tonnes of pre-cast grey concrete slabs were added to the outside of the building. It cost £80.1 million to complete.

Opening 
The V&A Dundee opened to the public on 15 September 2018 with international and national press previews taking place beforehand from 13–14 September 2018. The opening was celebrated with a 3D Festival which featured acts such as Primal Scream, Be Charlotte and Lewis Capaldi, along with a light show and a firework display. The opening highlights were broadcast on BBC Two Scotland in a programme hosted by Edith Bowman. The museum attracted 27,201 visitors during its first week and 100,000 in its first three weeks.

The museum was officially opened by Prince William, Duke of Cambridge, and Catherine, Duchess of Cambridge, in a private official opening, held on 28 January 2019. On 30 March 2019, the museum achieved its target of 500,000 visitors within a year, six months earlier than expected.

Temporary closure 

The V&A Dundee was due to launch its fourth exhibition, focusing on the fashion of Mary Quant, in early April 2020, but the museum temporarily closed on 18 March 2020 because of the COVID-19 pandemic.

Features

Exhibition galleries 
The exhibition galleries are where the temporary exhibitions are placed.

Scottish Design Galleries 
The Scottish Design Galleries feature permanent design works from across Scotland.

The Oak Room
Charles Rennie Mackintosh's Oak Room was originally completed in 1908 after being commissioned by Catherine Cranston for use as a tearoom on Ingram Street in Glasgow. The 13.5-metre-long double-height room now forms a part of the permanent Scottish Design Gallery at the museum. The Oak Room was restored from over 700 original parts that had been stored by the Glasgow City Council for over 50 years. The room took 16 months to install, and the total cost of the restoration and conservation was £1.3 million (2018).

List of directors

Reception
V&A Dundee has received mixed reviews. It had been praised for being Scotland's first design museum and opening interactive exhibitions such as the Hello Robot exhibition in 2019. The museum was also named as one of the best places to visit in the world by TIME Magazine in 2019. It was the subject in 2019 of a profile in the Sky Arts programme The Art of Architecture.

In the first few months after opening, the museum was also criticised by architects because of the amount of unused space; some called the building "alarming" for elderly visitors, "silly", and "boring".

See also
Victoria and Albert Museum#Partnerships
List of art museums and galleries in Scotland

References

External links

Kengo Kuma buildings
Museums in Dundee
Art museums and galleries in Scotland
Museums established in 2018
Victoria and Albert Museum
2018 establishments in Scotland